Ojdanić is a Serbian and Croatian surname. It may refer to:

Era Ojdanić (born 1947), Serbian folk singer
Dragoljub Ojdanić, FR Yugoslav general and former Defence minister
Ecija Ojdanić (born 1974), Croatian actress
Žan Ojdanić (1971–2016), leader of the supporters group Torcida Split

Serbian surnames
Croatian surnames